Ashlyn or Ashlynn may refer to:

People with the given name 
Ashlyn Gere, American actress
Ashlyn Harris, American soccer player
Ashlyne Huff, American singer
Ashlyn Kilowan, South African cricketer
Ashlyn Martin, stage name of Laura Lynn Hale (born 1946), American model and actress
Ashlyn Pearce, American actress
Ashlyn Sanchez, American actress
Ashlyn Rae Willson, American musician better known as Ashe
Ashlyn (album), 2021 album by Ashe
Ashlynn Yennie, American actress

People with the surname 
Quenton Ashlyn, British socialite
Shannon Ashlyn, Australian actress

Fictional characters 
 Ashlynn, in the video game Dragon Quest VI: Realms of Revelation
 Ashlyn Halperin, in the American horror franchise Final Destination
Ashlyn Caswell, in the Disney+ series High School Musical: The Musical: The Series

See also
Aisling (name)
Ashlyns Hall, building in England
Ashlyns School, in England

Feminine given names